Cosmin Chetroiu (born March 31, 1987) is a Romanian luger who has competed since 1999. Competing in two Winter Olympics, he earned his best finish of 17th in the men's doubles event at Vancouver in 2010.

He was born in Petroşani.

Chetroiu's best finish at the FIL World Luge Championships was 17th in the doubles event twice (2008, 2009). His best finish at the FIL European Luge Championships was 15th in the doubles event at Cesana in 2008.

References
2006 luge men's doubles results
FIL-Luge profile

External links 
 
 
 

1987 births
Living people
Romanian male lugers
Olympic lugers of Romania
Lugers at the 2006 Winter Olympics
Lugers at the 2010 Winter Olympics